The Man Who Cried is a 2000 drama film written and directed by Sally Potter, and starring Christina Ricci, Cate Blanchett, Johnny Depp, Harry Dean Stanton and John Turturro. The film tells the story of a young Jewish girl who, after being separated from her father in Soviet Russia, grows up in England and moves to Paris as a young adult, shortly before the beginning of World War II. It is the last film worked on by the French cinematographer Sacha Vierny.

Plot
Fegele Abramovich (Christina Ricci), a Russian Jew is separated from her father (Oleg Yankovsky) as a child in 1927. Her father has travelled to America to seek his fortune and plans to send for Fegele and her grandmother. Before leaving, he sings "Je Crois Entendre Encore" from the Bizet opera Les pêcheurs de perles to her. After her father leaves, the village is attacked and burned in a pogrom. Fegele escapes with the help of neighbours; after overcoming many obstacles, she is crowded onto a boat headed for Britain, with only a photo of her father and a coin given to her by her grandmother.

Upon arrival, an English official renames her "Susan" and places her with foster parents. English students at school taunt her by calling her a "gypsy", but she does not yet understand English. A teacher at the school overhears her singing "Je Crois Entendre Encore" in Yiddish, and teaches her to sing and speak in English.

Time passes, and Suzie auditions for a singing dance troupe heading for Paris. There, she meets an older Russian dancer named Lola (Cate Blanchett), and they share an apartment as friends. At a formal party, both women perform as dancers alongside a mysterious performing horseman, Cesar (Johnny Depp), a Romani to whom Suzie is attracted. After their performance outside, they overhear a tenor inside singing "Je Crois Entendre Encore"; the voice belongs to Dante (John Turturro), an Italian opera singer who immediately catches Lola's eye. Lola works her way into his good graces and falls for his charms, enticed by his wealth and success. Dante, Lola, Suzie, and Cesar all work for an opera company directed by Felix Perlman (Harry Dean Stanton). Dante is an imperious follower of Mussolini; this alienates him from Suzie even as he becomes Lola's lover. Meanwhile, Cesar introduces Suzie to his "family" (essentially his entire tribe), and they fall in love.

One day, Dante is rifling through Suzie's things after a dalliance with Lola in the apartment, and deduces her Jewish heritage after finding her father's photo. An elderly Jewish neighbour downstairs, Madame Goldstein (Miriam Karlin), also knows that Suzie is Jewish and has warned her of the dangers on the horizon as the Germans invade Poland. The following year, as the Germans invade France and approach Paris, an exodus begins of Jews and other people threatened by Nazism. Crowds for the operatic show dwindle, and eventually the only cast members left are Dante and Suzie. When Dante attempts to seduce Suzie, she rebuffs him. He lashes out at her for her heritage and her relationship with Cesar, whose heritage he also scorns. Perlman comes to her defence; he reminds Dante that as an Italian in Paris at that time, should Mussolini align with the Nazis, Dante's own position in Paris would be precarious. Perlman closes down the show; the Nazis enter Paris the following morning.

Dante reluctantly returns to his earlier role as minstrel. After another rebuff from Suzie, Dante reveals to a German officer that Suzie is a Jew. Lola overhears this and informs Suzie that she is in danger and must leave Paris. Lola has also decided to leave Dante and has purchased tickets for Suzie and herself on an ocean liner headed for America. The same night of the party, the Nazis attack the Romani village and kill a child. When Cesar comes to her apartment to say goodbye, Suzie expresses her desire to stay and help Cesar fight the Nazis for his family, but he tells her she must flee and find her father. They share a tender last evening together.

Suzie searches for her father and discovers that he changed his name, gave up singing, and moved west after hearing about the attack on his home village, which he assumed killed all the members of his family. Suzie goes to Hollywood, where her father was a studio head, and discovers he has a new family and that he is dying. She goes to the hospital, walks past his new wife and children who are waiting outside the door to his room, and is reunited with her father. He recognises her and expresses joy at her appearance. She sits on the side of his bed and sings "Je Crois Entendre Encore" to him in Yiddish as tears roll down her face.

Cast
 Christina Ricci as Suzie
 Oleg Yankovsky as Father
 Claudia Lander-Duke as Young Suzie
 Cate Blanchett as Lola
 Miriam Karlin as Madame Goldstein
 Johnny Depp as Cesar
 Harry Dean Stanton as Felix Perlman
 John Turturro as Dante Dominio
 Josh Bradford as extra

The singing voices for the characters of Dante and Suzie were provided by Salvatore Licitra and Iva Bittova, respectively.

Release
The film was first presented at the Venice Film Festival on 2 September 2000. The film screened at the London Film Festival; the Mar del Plata Film Festival, Argentina; the Tokyo International Film Festival & the Reykjavik Film Festival, Iceland among others.

Reception
The film received mixed to negative reviews, currently holding a 35% 'rotten' rating on review aggregate Rotten Tomatoes. The consensus, based on 69 reviews, says 'The storyline is overwrought and awkward, and the audience is distanced from the flatly drawn characters.' Metacritic calculated an average score of 40 out of 100 based on 22 reviews, indicating "mixed or average reviews".

Awards
Wins
 National Board of Review: NBR Award; Best Supporting Actress, Cate Blanchett; 2001.
 Florida Film Critics Circle Awards: FFCC Award; Best Supporting Actress, Cate Blanchett; 2002.

Nominations
 Venice Film Festival: Golden Lion, Sally Potter; 2000.

Soundtrack

The Man Who Cried: Original Motion Picture Soundtrack was released 22 May 2001. It features new music composed by Osvaldo Golijov, and was produced by Sally Potter and performed by the Royal Opera House Orchestra Covent Garden, Salvatore Licitra, and Taraf de Haïdouks.

References

External links
 
 
 
 

2000 films
2000 romantic drama films
2000s English-language films
Focus Features films
2000s French-language films
Working Title Films films
2000s Italian-language films
2000s Spanish-language films
Romani-language films
2000s Romanian-language films
2000s Russian-language films
StudioCanal films
Yiddish-language films
Films directed by Sally Potter
Films shot at Pinewood Studios
British romantic drama films
Films set in the 1920s
Films based on British novels
Films shot in Surrey
Films shot in Paris
Films set in the 1930s
2000 multilingual films
British multilingual films
French multilingual films
2000s British films